Arad (also Romanized as Ard, Erad, Īrad, and Ird) is a city and capital of Arad District, in Gerash County, Fars Province, Iran.  At the 2006 census, its population was 5,264, in 1,181 families.

The outskirts of the city include many farming areas and dry open land. Arad is enclosed by two large mountains running parallel to the city. This makes travel to the city difficult. There is one two sided paved road running from a two-way split further down the road. This highway runs both east and west to large cities such as Jahrom, Qom, Firouzabad, Shiraz, Lar, Evaz, Gerash, and continues all the way South to the port city of Bandar Abbas.

Demographics
Islamic Shia : 97%
Islamic Sunni : 1%
Turks:  1%
Afghan and other: 1%

Economy and infrastructure
Arad has a few markets where citizens may purchase fruits, vegetables, food, meats, bread, and other household items. The city also sports a lone gas station just outside the city. Many of the working population either work in a larger city/province, work in the farms, shops, or transport goods for a living. Most of the housing in the city is pre-modern clay and sand hardened structures. Newer buildings are made from bright white marble tile. The town is governed by a single Police/Military station/office.

Arad has 3 major mosques located around the city, one which was built just recently and is openly televised on the main Fars news network. The city also includes four smaller mosques dispersed around the town.

Transportation includes Iran's older model Paykan automobiles, Peugeot 206, motorcycles, Nissian S24 'Saipa', L90, and the harder to spot Samand Sedan.

References

Populated places in Gerash County
Cities in Fars Province